The 2023 FIBA 3x3 World Cup will be an international 3x3 basketball event that featured separate competitions for men's and women's national teams. The tournament will run between 30 May and 4 June 2023 in Vienna, Austria.

Medal summary

Medalists

References

External links

 
2023
2022–23 in European basketball
FIBA 3x3 World Cup
FIBA 3x3 World Cup
FIBA 3x3 World Cup
3x3
Sports competitions in Vienna
FIBA